Escadrille 67 of the French Air Force was founded at Lyon-Bron Airport during the First World War, on 17 September 1915. On 24 September, they were assigned to the IV Armee of the French Army. By late October, the escadrille was assigned to the defense of Verdun.

History

Dubbed Escadrille N67 for the Nieuport two-seaters they operated, the new unit performed numerous reconnaissance, photographic, artillery direction, and bombing missions. For their efforts, they were cited on 25 January 1916. In July, they were cited a second time, for engaging in 257 combats and downing 11 enemy aircraft. The second citation entitled the unit to wear a fourragere denoting a unit award of the Croix de Guerre; Escadrille N 67 was the first aerial unit to win this award. During that Summer of 1916, the escadrille traded its two-seaters for Nieuport single-seater fighters. On 1 November 1916, the unit would be incorporated into Groupe de Combat 13, joining Escadrille 65, Escadrille 112, and Escadrille N.124. 

After service with GC 13, the escadrille was detached from the groupe on 1 June 1917. It was assigned to an ad hoc Groupe Provisoire de Bonneuil subordinated to III Armee. After 1 August 1917, the escadrille re-equipped with SPAD fighters, becoming Escadrille SPA.67. On 18 January 1918, it was posted to replace Escadrille 73 in Groupe de Combat 12. Escadrille SPA 67 remained with GC 12 until war's end. The escadrille was credited with 42 victories during the war.

Escadrille SPA 67 remains an active part of the French Air Force.

Commanding officers

 Sous lieutenant Mathieu Tenant de la Tour 17 September 1915 - 20 September 1915
 Capitaine Olivier Galouzeau de Villepin: 21 September 1915 - 21 February 1916
 Capitaine Henri Constans de Saint-Sauveur: 22 February 1916 - 31 July 1917
 Capitaine Jacques d'Indy: 1 August 1917 - 5 April 1919

Notable personnel

 Sous lieutenant Jean Navarre 
 Sous lieutenant Georges Flachaire
 Sous lieutenant Marcel Viallet
 Lieutenant David Endicott Putnam
 Sous lieutenant Mathieu Tenant de la Tour

Aircraft

 Nieuport
 SPAD

Endnotes

References 
 Franks, Norman; Frank W. Bailey. Over the Front: A Complete Record of the Fighter Aces and Units of the United States and French Air Services, 1914-1918 Grub Street, 1992. , .

Further reading 
 Bailey, Frank W., and Christophe Cony. French Air Service War Chronology, 1914-1918: Day-to-Day Claims and Losses by French Fighter, Bomber and Two-Seat Pilots on the Western Front. London: Grub Street, 2001. 
 Davilla, James J., and Arthur M. Soltan. French Aircraft of the First World War. Stratford, CT: Flying Machines Press, 1997. 
 Les escadrilles de l'aéronautique militaire française: symbolique et histoire, 1912-1920. Vincennes: Service historique de l'armée de l'air, 2004.

External links
Escadrille N 67 - SPA - 67

French Air and Space Force squadrons